E200 may refer to:

Electronics
 Acer beTouch E200, a smartphone
 Orange E200, a mobile phone 
 PowerPC e200, a processor core
 Sansa e200 series, a portable media player developed by SanDisk

Vehicles

Automobiles
 Baojun E200, a Chinese electric microcar
 JMEV E200, a Chinese electric city car
 Zotye E200, a Chinese electric microcar

Trains
 KiHa E200, a Japanese train type
 A locomotive manufactured by GE Transportation for Taiwan Railways Administration

Buses
Enviro 200, a British Bus type

Other uses
 Sorbic acid, a food additive
 Estonia 200, a political party in Estonia